Inside My Kitchen is the debut extended play (EP) by Australian three-piece folk group Tiddas. The EP was released in October 1992.

In 2018, Lou Bennett said of the title track "I wrote “Inside My Kitchen” after my partner at the time had a psychotic episode. It was one of my first compositions and it helped me cope with this new and traumatic experience. Then a few years later I recorded it with Amy and Sal on our first EP. It was an important song in the lifetime of Tiddas. It became one of our main signature songs and still is today. We created many of our songs around the kitchen table together and after an eight year spell, it gives me great pleasure to come back to the stage with Amy and Sal to perform it again."

At the ARIA Music Awards of 1993, the EP received two nominations; ARIA Award for Best New Talent and ARIA Award for Best Indigenous Release.

Track listing

Release history

References

1992 debut EPs
EPs by Australian artists
Tiddas (band) albums